Pelham Ashby Ballenger (February 6, 1894 – December 8, 1948) was a Major League Baseball third baseman, for at least a week, with the Washington Senators in 1928.  He was a native of Gilreath's Mill, South Carolina, United States.

He made his debut on May 7 and played his final game on May 12.  In three games he was 1-for-9 (.111) and handled nine chances without making an error.

Ballenger died in 1948 in Greenville County, South Carolina.

External links
Baseball Reference

1894 births
1948 deaths
Washington Senators (1901–1960) players
Major League Baseball third basemen
Baseball players from South Carolina
Louisville Colonels (minor league) players
Columbus Senators players
Birmingham Barons players
Seattle Indians players
Chattanooga Lookouts players
Nashville Vols players
Norfolk Mary Janes players
Norfolk Tars players